Pixmania (styled PIXmania), once known as Fotovista, was a French-based e-commerce website, founded in 2000. It promotes a variety of products, including consumer electronics and baby products, with turnover of over 300million in 2013. It operates a website and until 2013 ran brick-and-mortar retail stores in Europe. It is active in 14 European countries.
 
Pixmania was majority owned (77%) by the British Dixons Retail plc (formerly DSG International plc) from 2006, selling it on to German-based holding company Mutares in 2013.

History
The Pixmania group has its roots in the Rosenblum family business (particularly the brothers Pierre and Jean-Claude); Les Laboratoires parisiens. Originally the group consisted of school photography Studio National, and a media distribution service, Press Labo Service.

In 2001 the torch was handed over to Steve and Jean-Emile Rosenblum (Jean-Claude's sons) with the help of investment funds supplied mainly by the LMBO group, a French venture capital firm. They purchased the LLP Group. Pixmania became an online retailer selling camera and photography equipment. As the business expanded the company was renamed Fotovista and then Pixmania Group in 2009. Pixmania sales grew from €70million in 2001 to €898million in 2011-2012 when Steve and Jean-Emile Rosenblum sold their remaining 20% shares in the company. In 2006, Steve and Jean-Emile Rosenblum sold a significant part of their shares to DSG International PLC.

On 12 April  2006, DSG International plc gained a 75% interest by acquiring LMBO Group's controlling stake in the company and shares from the Rosenblum family and a handful of managers, for €266 million (approximately £185 million). Under the deal agreed DSGi has an option to buy out the remaining 25 per cent from the family and management over the following three to five years. The acquisition was subject to approval by the European Union Competition Authority. After receiving approval the company completed the acquisition of 77% of the Fotovista Group for €261 million (approximately £184 million). In 2009, the group reverted to its former name, Pixmania.

In September 2013, Dixons Retail, owner of PC World and Currys, paid €69 million to offload the loss-making Pixmania to the German company Mutares AG. Pixmania had lost £31 million in the financial year ending 30 April 2013 and had acted as a drag on its parent's financial results despite a move by Dixons Retail to reorganise the business.

As of 7 November 2020, most domains in the pixmania family are parked, having invalid certificates or redirects to bitcoin/crypto currencies fraud pages.

References

External links
mutares holding company
Fotovista Corporate website
DSG International plc Corporate website
Pixmania website
myPix website
PIXavenue website
myPIX blog website
PIXmania-pro website
Primashop website

Consumer electronics retailers
Currys plc
Internet properties established in 2000
Multinational companies headquartered in France
Online retailers of France
Retail companies established in 2000